Aftermath (stylized as 'aftər,maθ), formerly known as  This Means Love, is the second studio album by Australian Contemporary Christian band Hillsong United. Production for the album began in March 2010 at Studios 301 in Sydney, Australia. It was announced on 10 November 2010, that coinciding with the Aftermath album release in February, Hillsong United would tour the United States and Canada in February and March 2011.

Aftermath debuted at number one on the US Billboard Christian Albums chart and at number 17 on the US Billboard 200 chart. In the United States, it ranked as the 17th best-selling Christian Album of 2011. The first single of the band, "Search My Heart", was released from the album on 21 January 2011 and appeared on the Billboard Christian Songs chart.

Background
In March 2010 it was revealed that Hillsong United was in the studio working on the first part of their latest album. United's Aftermath was originally stated to be a two part project, with a studio release in September 2010 and another in 2011, but would later be conjoined into one album.
On 25 May 2010 it was confirmed that stage two of the album was done after three weeks in the studio. The album title was announced via Hillsong United frontman Joel Houston's Twitter account on 27 October 2010. During a broadcast of Hillsong Backstage at Hillsong Conference 2010, it was uncovered that the album would debut in February 2011. There was a photo shoot lasting 3 days in over 10 different locations for the album artwork and photo collection on their website. The album leaked on 15 January 2011, exactly one month before the album's planned release date, when it was unintentionally made available for purchase on the US iTunes Store.

Talking about how the album was created, Joel Houston said: "We took a whole year off really doing something. And we had a bit of a soul search and talked to each other and said, 'if we're gonna do this, as in United, and keep moving with it, what's it going to look like? And how prepared are we? ...Maybe to just ride on the coattails of what we've been doing for the last ten years or so or do we want to really take this thing forward?' And I think we collectively decided, 'you know what? Let's throw ourselves into it like it's the first time we've ever done anything'." The album marks Marty Sampson's return, who sings the title track "Aftermath".

Concerning the title, Houston said: "Normally 'aftermath' has a negative, even traumatic, connotation. At the same time, when I look at the Crucifixion as an event, it paints an extraordinarily negative and horrific picture. But the aftermath of the Cross is hope for all mankind. It's grace, freedom, peace, life and everything that is good about God. I absolutely love that picture."

Track listing

Reception

Critical response

Allmusic's Jared Johnson gave the album four out of five stars, saying: " Aftermath shows that Hillsong continue to set the bar high and blur the lines between studio albums and live worship. Lindsay Williams of Crosswalk.com described the album as "a compilation album with singers trading lead vocals from song to song" and pointed out the title track ("Aftermath"), "Like An Avalanche", "Father", and "Awakening" as highlights of the album. She added: "Hillsong combines the musical prowess heard in mainstream music—even borrowing soundscapes from British bands like Coldplay at times—and pairs this atmospheric aura with reverent lyrics. Yet, Hillsong goes beyond the congregational-friendliness common to modern worship anthems by adding their own artistic flair." John Brandon of Christianity Today pointed out "Take Heart", "Go" and "Search My Heart" as the highlights of the album and summarized it saying: "More textured than previous releases, the new Hillsong United is also more experimental." Writing for Jesus Freak Hideout, Ryan Barbee concluded: "this offering definitely shows glimpses of brilliance, pure worship and a broadening of the creative horizons. For churches it might not offer what previous releases did, but it might influence a little bit of change." Jono Davies of Louder Than The Music wrote: "Creativity spills out on this album. [...] Overall this is another stunning album from Hillsong United, but is it the best album they have ever made? I don't know, but it's up there. Today's Christian Music's Matt Conner called the album "a testament to a mature, talented ensemble coming together to forge their best work yet".

Accolades
Aftermath was nominated at the 43rd GMA Dove Awards for Praise & Worship Album of the Year.

Personnel
Hillsong United
 Matt Crocker – vocals, acoustic guitar, percussion, keyboard, synthesizer
 Adam Crosariol – bass
 Jonathon Douglass – vocals, electric piano, percussion
 Jad Gillies – vocals, electric guitar, percussion
 Joel Houston – vocals, electric guitar, keyboard, synthesizer, bass
 Peter James – piano, keyboard, synthesizer
 Timon Klein – electric guitar
 Simon Kobler – drums, percussion
 Dylan Thomas – electric guitar
 Jill McCloghry – guitar, vocals 
 Hayley Law - vocals 

Additional musicians 
 Michael Guy Chislett (past UNITED musician) – engineer, producer, guitar, keyboards, piano, percussion 
 Benjamin Tennikoff – keyboards, piano, accordion, glockenspiel, percussion 
 Matt Tennikoff – bass 
 Joel Hingston – guitar 
 Chris Bennett – violin 
 Hanna Creeze – violin 
 Lauren Hodges – violin 
 David Rodgers – drums 
 Jilcasey Row – vocals
 Ben Whincop – bass, engineer 
 Brooke Fraser – background vocals 
 Annie Garratt – background vocals 
 Chantel Norman – background, vocals 
 Marty Sampson – vocals on "Aftermath" 
 David Ware – vocals on "Rhythms of Grace"

Charts

Album charts

Year-end charts

Singles chart

Singles year-end chart

References

External links
Welcome to the Aftermath
HILLSONG UNITED NORTH AMERICA  2011 “AFTERMATH” TOUR  

Hillsong United albums
2011 albums